Calbourne and Shalfleet railway station, was an intermediate  station of the  Freshwater, Yarmouth and Newport Railway, incorporated  in 1860, opened over a ten-month period between 1888 and 1889 and closed 65 years later. Situated between the two villages  and serving a moderately populous rural area  it was a "reasonably" successful station on an ultimately unprofitable  line. Originally the station had a cottage style front but after absorption by the Southern a corrugated building from the acrimonious-split era was relocated to the site. The station itself, situated on the down side,  has long been demolished and replaced with a modern bungalow; but the level-crossing keeper's cottage, a short distance away at Pounds Lane, is still visitable.

See also 

 List of closed railway stations in Britain

References 

Disused railway stations on the Isle of Wight
Former Freshwater, Yarmouth and Newport Railway stations
Railway stations in Great Britain opened in 1889
Railway stations in Great Britain closed in 1953